Ascalenia unifasciella is a moth in the family Cosmopterigidae. It is found in Afghanistan.

The wingspan is 6–7.2 mm.

References

Moths described in 1969
Ascalenia
Moths of Asia